Carl Benton Reid (August 14, 1893– March 16, 1973) was an American actor.

Early years
Reid was born in Lansing, Michigan. He used his full name professionally because when he worked in radio, four other people in the business were named Carl Reid.

Career

For seven years, Reid performed in leading-man roles of productions at the Cleveland Play House. He achieved fame on the Broadway stage in 1939 as Oscar Hubbard, one of Regina Giddens's (Tallulah Bankhead) greedy, devious brothers in the play The Little Foxes, and made his film debut reprising his role opposite Bette Davis in the 1941 film version. He also appeared in several Shakespeare plays on Broadway, and in the original production of Eugene O'Neill's The Iceman Cometh, as Harry Slade.
His stern, cold demeanor quickly stereotyped him in villainous, and/or unpleasant characters, although he could play a sympathetic role, as he did occasionally in such films as the 1957 TV-movie version of The Pied Piper of Hamelin. Here he played the Mayor of Middelburg, who unsuccessfully requests help from the Mayor of Hamelin (Claude Rains), when Hamelin is the victim of a flood. The flood leads to the famous plague of rats which invade Hamelin, and set the main plot in motion. He played the American Admiral, who is leading the peace talks between the Americans and Chinese during the Korean War in MGM's Pork Chop Hill. His last film role was the judge in  Madame X (1966).

On old-time radio, Reid played Roger Allen in the soap opera Big Sister.

On television, Reid had the role of the U.S. spymaster known only as The Man in Amos Burke, Secret Agent. He made four guest appearances on Perry Mason during the show's nine-year run between 1957 and 1966. His final television role was as Claude Townsend in the TV series The F.B.I..

Personal life
Reid was married to actress Hazel Harrison, whom he met at the Cleveland Play House. They had a daughter, Shirley Jane.

Death
On March 16, 1973, Reid died at his home in Studio City, California, at age 79. He was survived by his wife and his daughter.

Selected filmography

The Little Foxes (1941) as Oscar Hubbard
Tennessee Johnson (1942) as Congressman Hargrove
The North Star (1943) as Boris Simonov
In a Lonely Place (1950) as Capt. Lochner
Convicted (1950) as Capt. Douglas
The Fuller Brush Girl (1950) as Mr. Christy
The Killer That Stalked New York (1950) as Health Commissioner Ellis
Stage to Tucson (1950) as Dr. Noah Banteen
The Flying Missile (1950) as Dr. Gates, USN
Smuggler's Gold (1951) as 'Pop' Hodges
The Great Caruso (1951) as Park Benjamin
Lorna Doone (1951) as Sir Ensor Doone
Criminal Lawyer (1951) as Tucker Bourne
The Family Secret (1951) as Dr. Steve Reynolds
Indian Uprising (1952) as John Clemson
Boots Malone (1952) as John Williams
The First Time (1952) as Andrew Bennet
The Sniper (1952) as Mr. Liddell (uncredited)
Carbine Williams (1952) as Claude Williams
The Brigand (1952) as Prime Minister Triano
The Story of Will Rogers (1952) as Senator Clem Rogers
Main Street to Broadway (1953) as Judge Robbins in Fantasy Sequence
Escape from Fort Bravo (1953) as Col. Owens
The Command (1954) as Col. Janeway
Broken Lance (1954) as Clem Lawton
The Egyptian (1954) as Senmut
Athena (1954) as Mr. Griswalde
Wichita (1955) as Mayor Andrew Hope
One Desire (1955) as Sen. Kenneth A. Watrous
The Left Hand of God (1955) as Father Cornelius
The Spoilers (1955) as Judge Stillman
A Day of Fury (1956) as Judge John J. McLean
The First Texan (1956) as President Andrew Jackson (uncredited)
Strange Intruder (1956) as James Carmichael
The Last Wagon (1956) as Gen. Howard
Battle Hymn (1957) as Deacon Edwards
Spoilers of the Forest (1957) as John Mitchell
Time Limit (1957) as Lt. Gen. J. Connors
Tarzan's Fight for Life (1958) as Dr. Sturdy
The Last of the Fast Guns (1958) as John Forbes
The Trap (1959) as Sheriff Lloyd Anderson
Pork Chop Hill (1959) as American Admiral at Peace Conference
The Bramble Bush (1960) as Sam McFie
The Gallant Hours (1960) as Vice-Adm. Robert Ghormley
The Underwater City (1962) as Dr. Junius Halstead
Pressure Point (1962) as Chief Medical Officer
The Ugly American (1963) as Senator at Confirmation Hearing
Madame X (1966) as The Judge

References

External links

 
 
 

1893 births
1973 deaths
20th-century American male actors
American male film actors
American male radio actors
American male stage actors
American male television actors
Male actors from Lansing, Michigan
Male actors from Michigan